This is a list of defunct airlines from Israel.

See also
 List of airlines of Israel
 List of airports in Israel

References

Israel
Airlines
Airlines, defunct